The International Union of Soil Sciences (IUSS), founded in 1924 under the name International Society of Soil Science, is a scientific union and member of the International Council for Science (ICSU).

The Union has 86 national and regional member societies with about 60,000 scientists in several countries and individual members in 57 countries. Every four years, the IUSS holds the World Congress of Soil Science.

As of January 2023, the secretariat was taken over by the Council for Agricultural Research and Economics of Italy. Previously, the secreteriat was managed by Sigbert Huber, an officer of the Environment Agency Austria (Umweltbundesamt), located in Vienna.

Mission 
The purpose of the IUSS is to promote all branches of soil science and its applications, to promote contacts among scientists and other persons engaged in the study and the application of soil science; to stimulate scientific research and to further the application of such research.

The IUSS is a founding partner of the International Year of Planet Earth and supports all of its activities. The IUSS has contributed to the International Year of Planet Earth's brochure "Soil – earth's living skin", which has been translated into several languages.

The IUSS publishes monthly the IUSS Alert and twice a year the IUSS Bulletin. December 5 is celebrated as the World Soil Day.

Organization: The Divisions
The IUSS has Divisions and Commissions in the following areas:

Division 1 – Soils in space and time
C1.1 Soil morphology and micromorphology
C1.2 Soil geography
C1.3 Soil genesis
C1.4 Soil classification
C1.5 Pedometrics
C1.6 Paleopedology

Division 2 – Soil properties and processes
C2.1 Soil physics
C2.2 Soil chemistry
C2.3 Soil biology
C2.4 Soil mineralogy
C2.5 Soil interfacial reactions

Division 3 – Soil use and management
C3.1 Soil evaluation and land use planning
C3.2 Soil and water conservation
C3.3 Soil fertility and plant nutrition
C3.4 Soil engineering and technology
C3.5 Soil degradation control, remediation, and reclamation

Division 4 – The role of soil in sustaining society and the environment
C4.1 Soil and the environment
C4.2 Soil, food security, and human health
C4.3 Soil and land use change
C4.4 Soil education and public awareness
C4.5 History, philosophy, and sociology of soil science

This structure and the Commissions have grown from the original six Commissions established in 1924.

In addition, the IUSS holds many Working Groups. Every Working Group is associated to a Commission.

Organization: The President 
Until 2014, the IUSS President was designated by the national soil science society that was responsible for the next World Congress of Soil Science. This was normally a 4-years period. The change in office was immediately after closing the World Congress. However, many tasks of scientific leadership were done by a Secretary-General. The last IUSS President according to this regulation was Jae Yang, who acted from the closure of the World Congress 2010 till the closure of the World Congress 2014.

Since 2014, the IUSS President is elected by the IUSS Council for a 2-years period. Since 2017, the change in office is January 1. The election is more than two years in advance. The IUSS President is the scientific leader, and the Secretary (instead of the former Secretary-General) is the organizing leader. The first IUSS President according to the new regulation was Rainer Horn, who acted from the closure (June 13) of the World Congress 2014 till December 31, 2016.

Congresses and Presidents 
World Congresses of Soil Science and IUSS Presidents

See also
World Congress of Soil Science (WCSS)

References

External links
IUSS Website

Members of the International Council for Science
International scientific organizations
Soil and crop science organizations
Scientific organizations established in 1924
Members of the International Science Council